Simone Peter (born 3 December 1965) is a German Alliance 90/The Greens politician. Between 2013 and 2018, she co-chaired the party along with Cem Özdemir.

Political career
Between 2009 and 2012, she was Saarland's State Minister for the Environment, Energy and Transport in the cabinet of former Minister-President Peter Müller (CDU).

Peter served as a Green Party delegate to the Federal Convention for the purpose of electing the President of Germany in 2017. In the unsuccessful negotiations to form a coalition government with the Christian Democrats – both the Christian Democratic Union (CDU) and the Christian Social Union in Bavaria (CSU) – and the Free Democratic Party (FDP) following the 2017 national elections, Peter was part of the 14-member delegation of the Green Party.

Life after politics
Since February 2018, Peter has been serving as chairwoman of the German Renewable Energy Federation (BEE).

Other activities
 ZDF, Member of the Television Board 
 Arte, Member of the Programme Advisory Board
 German Federation for the Environment and Nature Conservation (BUND)
 Nature and Biodiversity Conservation Union (NABU), Member
 German United Services Trade Union (ver.di), Member

Personal life
Peter is the daughter of SPD politician Brunhilde Peter, who served as State minister and vice Minister-President under Oskar Lafontaine. Raised in Dillingen, Peter studied microbiology at Universität des Saarlandes in Saarbrücken and received a PhD.

After being editor-in-chief of Eurosolar, she was founding director of a state-supported communications agency promoting Renewable energies. Today, she is married and mother of one child and lives in Saarbrücken.

References

External links

 Profile of Simone Pater in the Saarland Landtag 

1965 births
Members of the Landtag of Saarland
Living people
Alliance 90/The Greens politicians
People from Saarbrücken (district)
Women members of State Parliaments in Germany
21st-century German women politicians